Andreja Marinković (born 23 January 1965) is a Serbian athlete. He competed in the men's long jump at the 1996 Summer Olympics.

References

1965 births
Living people
Athletes (track and field) at the 1996 Summer Olympics
Serbian male long jumpers
Yugoslav male long jumpers
Olympic athletes of Yugoslavia
Place of birth missing (living people)